Ockley is  a village in Surrey, England.

Ockley may also refer to:
Ockley, Indiana, a town in Indiana, United States
Ockley railway station, Surrey, England

People with the surname
Simon Ockley (1678–1720), British academic